Tracy Pennycuick is an American politician. A Republican, she is a member of the Pennsylvania State Senate representing the 24th district since 2023. She previously served as a member of the Pennsylvania House of Representatives representing the 147th district in Montgomery County from 2021 to 2022.

Biography
Pennycuick graduated from Mansfield High School in 1983, and received a bachelor's degree in business from the University of Missouri in 1987 and a MPA in public administration from Post University in 2015. She served in the U.S. Army for 26 years including active and reserve service.

Pennsylvania House of Representatives 
In 2020, Pennycuick was elected to the Pennsylvania House of Representatives representing the 147th district, which is part of Montgomery County. She defeated Democratic candidate Jill Dennin and Libertarian candidate Jared Martin with 54.7% of the vote in the general election.

Pennycuick served on the Commerce, Game & Fisheries, Urban Affairs, and Veterans Affairs & Emergency Preparedness committees.

Pennsylvania State Senate 
In 2021, State Senator Bob Mensch announced his intention to retire at the end of his term in 2022. Pennycuick was elected to succeed Mensch in 2022.

References

External links
Pennsylvania House of Representatives profile
Campaign website

Living people
Republican Party members of the Pennsylvania House of Representatives
21st-century American women politicians
Women state legislators in Pennsylvania
Year of birth missing (living people)
University of Missouri alumni

|-

Republican Party Pennsylvania state senators
Politicians from Montgomery County, Pennsylvania